The Ride Majestic is the tenth studio album by Swedish melodic death metal band Soilwork. It was released on 28 August 2015 and is the first album to not feature longtime bassist Ola Flink who left before the recording of the album and also the last album to feature longtime drummer Dirk Verbeuren, who left the band in July 2016 to join Megadeth.

Background 
On 5 December 2014, Soilwork frontman Björn Strid confirmed that work had begun on a new album when he posted a picture on Facebook of him listening to new demos. Strid also stated that Soilwork are sounding "better than ever". It was also confirmed that Soilwork has teamed up with Chuck Billy's Breaking Bands LLC management company for the album. 

On 8 July, the band released the title track as the album's first single. On 13 August, the album teaser was released. On 20 August, the band released "Enemies in Fidelity" as a promotional single.

Track listing

Credits 
Writing, performance and production credits are adapted from the album's liner notes.

Personnel

Soilwork 
 Björn Strid – vocals
 Sylvain Coudret – guitars, bass
 David Andersson – guitars, bass
 Sven Karlsson – keyboards
 Dirk Verbeuren – drums
 Markus Wibom – bass (credited, but did not perform)

Guest musicians 
 Pascal Poulsen (Odium) – vocals on "The Phantom"
 Nathan James Biggs (Sonic Syndicate) – vocals on "Father and Son, Watching the World Go Down"

Additional musicians 
 Hanna Carlsson – cello on "The Ride Majestic", "Enemies in Fidelity" and "The Phantom"; piano on "The Ride Majestic"

Production 
 David Castillo – production, recording, mixing (tracks 12-13)
 Soilwork – production
 Björn Strid – vocal production and recording
 Linus Corneliusson – additional recording, mix assistance, additional editing
 Rickard Gustafsson – drum tech
 Per Burström – drum tech
 Jens Bogren – mixing (tracks 1-11), mastering
 Tony Lindgren – mastering assistance

Artwork and design 
 Róbert Borbás – cover art
 Hannah Verbeuren – photography
 Mircea Gabriel Eftemie – layout, additional art
 Carlos Holmberg – Soilwork logo
 Tobias Green – Soilwork emblem a.k.a. The Sledgehammer Massiah

Studios 
 Fascination Street Studios 1, Stockholm, Sweden – recording
 Black-out in the Red Room, Landskrona, Sweden – vocals recording
 Fascination Street Studios 2, Örebro, Sweden – mixing, mastering

Charts

References

External links 
 
 The Ride Majestic at Nuclear Blast

2015 albums
Nuclear Blast albums
Soilwork albums